The 2019 ASEAN Grand Prix – Second Leg was the second tournament of the 2019 ASEAN Grand Prix, an annual series of international women's volleyball tournaments contested by 4 national teams that are the members of the Southeast Asian Zonal Volleyball Association (SEAZVA), the sport's regional governing body affiliated to Asian Volleyball Confederation (AVC). Games were played at Santa Rosa, Laguna, Philippines from 4 to 6 October 2019.

Teams
Four national teams featured in the 2019 ASEAN Grand Prix - First Leg.

Pool standing procedure
 Total number of victories (matches won, matched lost)
 In the event of a tie, the following first tiebreaker was to apply: The teams was to be ranked by the most point gained per match as follows:
Match won 3–0 or 3–1: 3 points for the winner, 0 points for the loser
Match won 3–2: 2 points for the winner, 1 point for the loser
Match forfeited: 3 points for the winner, 0 points (0–25, 0–25, 0–25) for the loser

Squads

League results

 All times are Philippine Standard Time (UTC+08:00).

|}

|}

Final standings

Awards
 Most Valuable Player
  Pleumjit Thinkaow
 Best Spiker
  Pimpichaya Kokram
 Best Server
  Wulandri Ratri
 Best Blocker
  Mary Joy Baron
 Best Setter
  Mutiara Lutfi Tri Retno
 Best Libero
  Dawn Nicole Macandili

References

ASEAN Grand Prix - second leg